The Degankhel is a Pashtun tribe, primarily living in Afghanistan and Pakistan.

The tribe predominantly lives in the districts of North Waziristan, Dir, Bajaur, [[ Shabqadar ] Haleemzai,khobai,Morankorona], and Swat, Mingora Degan Khel Cham, Shin, Degan lakhar, of the Pakistani province of Khyber Pakhtunkhwa.

See also
Mandanr

References

Yusufzai Pashtun tribes